was the lead ship in the  of three composite hulled, sail-and-steam corvettes of the early Imperial Japanese Navy. The ship was named for a mountain located between Osaka and Nara prefectures.

Background
Katsuragi was designed as an iron-ribbed, wooden-hulled, three-masted barque-rigged sloop-of-war with a coal-fired double-expansion reciprocating steam engine with six cylindrical boilers driving a double screw. Her basic design was based on experience gained in building  and  sloops, but was already somewhat obsolescent in comparison to contemporary European warships when completed. Katsuragi was laid down at Yokosuka Naval Arsenal 18 August 1883 under the direction of British-educated Japanese naval architect Sasō Sachū. She was launched on 31 March 1885 and commissioned on 4 November 1887.

Operational history
Katsuragi saw combat service in the First Sino-Japanese War of 1894-1895, patrolling between Korea, Dairen and Weihaiwei. She was also at the Battle of Yalu River in a reserve capacity in the Western Sea Fleet.

On 21 March 1898, Katsuragi was re-designated a third-class gunboat, and was used for coastal survey and patrol duties.

On 6 October 1900, Katsuragi ran aground off of Izu Ōshima. It took over a month to refloat her, after which she underwent extensive repairs at Yokosuka, during which time her sail rigging was removed, and she was rearmed with eight QF 2.5 pdr guns and six quadruple Nordenfelt guns, and her torpedoes were upgraded from 15 inch to 18-inch torpedo tubes.

During the Russo-Japanese War of 1904-1905, Katsuragi served as a guard ship in Nagasaki harbor.

Katsuragi was refitted again in 1907, when her guns were replaced with four 3-inch and two 2.5-inch guns, and she was reclassified as a survey ship. She was reclassified again as a second-class coastal patrol vessel on 28 August 1912, and was removed from the navy list and scrapped on 4 November 1913.

Notes

References
Chesneau, Roger and Eugene M. Kolesnik (editors), All The World's Fighting Ships 1860-1905, Conway Maritime Press, 1979 reprinted 2002, 

Screw sloops of the Imperial Japanese Navy
Naval ships of Japan
1885 ships
First Sino-Japanese War naval ships of Japan
Russo-Japanese War naval ships of Japan
Three-masted ships
Ships built by Yokosuka Naval Arsenal
Katsuragi-class corvettes